Iniyum Kurukshetram is a 1986 Indian Malayalam-language action film directed by J. Sasikumar and written by S. L. Puram Sadanandan. The film stars Mohanlal, Jagathy Sreekumar, Shobhana and Kaviyoor Ponnamma. The music for the film was composed by M. K. Arjunan. The film was a blockbuster at the box office.

Plot

It is the story of two brothers who are adopted by a rich uncle to transfer his inheritance, who fight each other per principles and practices.

Cast

Mohanlal as Sub Inspector Suresh
Jagathy Sreekumar
Shobhana
Lissy
Kaviyoor Ponnamma
Adoor Bhasi
Nahas
C. I. Paul
K. P. Ummer
M. G. Soman
Meena
Rahman
Thodupuzha Vasanthi

Soundtrack
The music was composed by M. K. Arjunan and the lyrics was written by K. Jayakumar.

Release

References

External links
 

1986 films
1980s Malayalam-language films
Indian action films